Andrzej Tomza (6 August 1931 – 17 June 2006) was a Polish sports shooter. He competed in the 50 metre pistol event at the 1960 Summer Olympics. He was shot dead in his garden in 2006.

References

1931 births
2006 deaths
Polish male sport shooters
Olympic shooters of Poland
Shooters at the 1960 Summer Olympics
Sportspeople from Lublin
Deaths by firearm in Poland